Waldo, California may refer to:
 Sausalito, California
 Waldo Junction, California